Fernando Jubero Carmona (born 27 February 1974) is a Spanish football manager.

Career
Born in Barcelona, Catalonia, Jubero worked as a scout for the youth categories of FC Barcelona and the Aspire Academy. Ahead of the 2012 season, he was named the new director of football of Paraguayan club Guaraní.

In June 2013, Jubero was named interim manager of Guaraní, after Diego Alonso left the club. He was in charge of the club for the remaining matches of the 2023 Apertura tournament, and later returned to his previous role as Gustavo Díaz was named manager.

On 6 August 2013, Jubero was again appointed interim, after Díaz was sacked. He was later appointed as permanent manager, but left the club on 4 December 2015.

On 21 February 2016, Jubero was appointed Olimpia manager, replacing Francisco Arce. On 20 November, he was himself dismissed, and was named at the helm of Libertad on 11 December.

On 23 December 2017, Jubero left Libertad after having to make a treatment back in his home country. The following 22 August, he took over Cerro Porteño back in Paraguay, leaving on a mutual consent on 20 May 2019.

On 3 December 2019, Jubero was named in charge of Japanese club Júbilo Iwata for the 2020 season, but was dismissed on 2 October 2020. On 12 June 2021, he returned to Guaraní after being appointed in the place of Gustavo Costas.

On 24 November 2022, Jubero left Guaraní on a mutual consent.

Managerial statistics

References

External links

1974 births
Living people
Spanish football managers
Club Guaraní managers
Club Olimpia managers
Club Libertad managers
Cerro Porteño managers
Júbilo Iwata managers
Spanish expatriate sportspeople in Paraguay
Expatriate football managers in Paraguay
Spanish expatriate sportspeople in Japan
Expatriate football managers in Japan
J1 League managers
J2 League managers